Park Jung-hwan (born 14 January 1977) is a former South Korean footballer.

Club career

Korean club career 
Park Jung-hwan debuted in FC Seoul then known as Anyang LG Cheetahs and spent his mandatory two years military service spell with Gwangju Sangmu, from 2004 to 2005. After a spell abroad in China with Yiteng Football Club, he returned to the National League in the summer of 2007 to sign for Suwon City.

Persiba 
He made his first appearance for the club on 5 November, coming on as substitute for Fery Ariawan against Bontang FC.

Park's first goal for Persiba came in a Round 8 of Indonesian Super League game against Persija on the 21 November 2009.

PSM 
When the February transfer window opened, Park joined PSM on a six-month loan.

Sriwijaya FC 
Sriwijaya was the third club he played for, one year after he arrived in Indonesia. On 11 August, the Sumatera Ekspres reported that Jung-Hwan had agreed to join Sriwijaya.

Park was given the number 88 shirt.

Honours

Club honors
Sriwijaya
Indonesian Community Shield (1): 2010
Indonesian Inter Island Cup (1): 2010

References

External links
 
 Profile at liga-indonesia.co.id

South Korean footballers
South Korean expatriate footballers
FC Seoul players
Gimcheon Sangmu FC players
Jeonbuk Hyundai Motors players
Suwon FC players
PSM Makassar players
K League 1 players
Zhejiang Yiteng F.C. players
China League One players
Korea National League players
Liga 1 (Indonesia) players
1977 births
Living people
Expatriate footballers in China
South Korean expatriate sportspeople in China
Expatriate footballers in Indonesia
South Korean expatriate sportspeople in Indonesia
Association football forwards
Footballers from Seoul